Ronald Simpson may refer to:

Ronald Simpson (actor) (1896–1957), British actor
Ronnie Simpson (1930–2004), Scottish football goalkeeper
Ron Simpson, English footballer
Ronald Albert Simpson, Australian poet
Ronny Jordan, real name Ronald Simpson, guitarist

See also
Ronald Simson, Scottish rugby union player